Isaac Amoako (born 20 August 1983) is a professional footballer, who currently plays as a goalkeeper for Dreams.

Career 
Amoako began his career with Brong-Ahafo United and signed in 2007 for Asante Kotoko.

References

1983 births
Living people
Association football goalkeepers
Ghanaian footballers
Asante Kotoko S.C. players
2011 African Nations Championship players
BA Stars F.C. players
Ghana A' international footballers
2014 African Nations Championship players